Esmail Kola may refer to:
 Esmail Kola-ye Bozorg
 Esmail Kola-ye Kuchek